Four ships of the Icelandic Coast Guard have been named ICGV Þór.

  was the first ship own by the Icelandic Coast Guard. Bought used in 1926 and stranded in 1929.
  was built in Stettin, Germany, in 1922 as Senator Schäfer, but served the ICG from 1930 to 1939
 , an offshore patrol vessel. Served in all three Cod Wars conflicts between Iceland and the United Kingdom. Sold in 1982.
 , a Chile built offshore patrol vessel. Current flagship of the Icelandic Coast Guard.

Icelandic Coast Guard
Ship names